Chuma may refer to:

People
 James Chuma (c. 1850–1882), assistant of David Livingstone, caravan leader on further expeditions
 Chuma Edoga (born 1997), American football player
 Chuma Mmeka, poet, writer, actor, activist and child protection expert
 Chuma Okeke (born 1998), American basketball player
 Chuma (footballer) (born 1997), Spanish footballer

Other uses
 Chūma, a medieval Japanese transport system
 Chuma, La Paz, a municipality in Bolivia
 Islands' Fraternity and Unity Party, a political party in the Comoros known by the acronym CHUMA